Thomas Gene Fisher (April 4, 1942 – November 21, 2016) was a Major League Baseball pitcher. Nicknamed "Big Fish", the 6'0", 180 lb. right-hander was signed by the Baltimore Orioles as an amateur free agent before the 1962 season. He played briefly for the Orioles in 1967.

Fisher had a record of 10–6 with a 3.04 earned run average for the Triple-A Rochester Red Wings when he was called up to Baltimore in September 1967. His career minor league record at the time was 65–33, a winning percentage of .663. He made his major league debut in relief on September 20 against the Washington Senators at D.C. Stadium. He pitched 1.1 scoreless innings, walking two batters. His second big league action came two days later, in a home game against the Boston Red Sox. He hurled two more scoreless innings, striking out one batter, All-Star catcher Elston Howard.

On April 30, 1969 he was traded by the Orioles along with pitcher John O'Donoghue to the Seattle Pilots, and never again made it to the major league level. His lifetime ERA for 3.1 innings stands at 0.00.

Minor League Trivia
Fisher led Northern League pitchers with 16 complete games while playing for the Aberdeen Pheasants in 1964.
He led Eastern League pitchers in complete games (16), shutouts (4), winning percentage (.700), strikeouts (142), and ERA (1.88) while playing for the Elmira Pioneers in 1966.
He tied for the International League lead with 5 shutouts in 1967.

External links
, or Retrosheet, or Pura Pelota (Venezuelan Winter League)
 Obituary

1942 births
2016 deaths
Aberdeen Pheasants players
Appleton Foxes players
Baltimore Orioles players
Baseball players from Cleveland
Bluefield Orioles players
Elmira Pioneers players
Florida Instructional League Orioles players
Fox Cities Foxes players
Indianapolis Indians players
Jacksonville Suns players
Major League Baseball pitchers
Navegantes del Magallanes players
American expatriate baseball players in Venezuela
Ohio Bobcats baseball players
Ohio University alumni
Portland Beavers players
Rochester Red Wings players
Stockton Ports players
Tri-City Atoms players
Vancouver Mounties players